The 2002 NCAA Division I Men's Swimming and Diving Championships were contested in March 2002 at Gabrielsen Natatorium at the University of Georgia in Athens, Georgia at the 79th annual NCAA-sanctioned swim meet to determine the team and individual national champions of Division I men's collegiate swimming and diving in the United States.

Texas once again topped the team standings, finishing just 11 points ahead of Stanford. It was the Longhorns' third consecutive and ninth overall national title.

Team standings
Note: Top 10 only
(H) = Hosts
(DC) = Defending champions
Full results

See also
List of college swimming and diving teams

References

NCAA Division I Men's Swimming and Diving Championships
NCAA Division I Swimming And Diving Championships
|NCAA Division I Men's Swimming And Diving Championships
NCAA Division I Men's Swimming and Diving Championships